Parornix persicella is a moth of the family Gracillariidae. It is known from the central Asian part of Russia, Iran, Kazakhstan, Tajikistan, Turkmenistan and Uzbekistan.

The larvae feed on Amygdalus and Persica species. They probably mine the leaves of their host plant.

References

Parornix
Moths of Asia
Moths described in 1955